The Roman Catholic Diocese of Plzeň  is a diocese located in the city of Plzeň in the Ecclesiastical province of Prague in the Czech Republic.

History
 May 31, 1993: Established as Diocese of Plzeň from the Diocese of České Budějovice, Diocese of Litoměřice and Metropolitan Archdiocese of Praha

Leadership
 Bishops of Plzeň (Roman rite)
 Bishop František Radkovský (May 31, 1993)
 Bishop Tomas Holub (April 30, 2016)

Churches
Church of All Saints (Plzeň)

See also
Roman Catholicism in the Czech Republic

Sources
 GCatholic.org
 Catholic Hierarchy
  Diocese website

Roman Catholic dioceses in the Czech Republic
Christian organizations established in 1993
Plzeň
Roman Catholic dioceses and prelatures established in the 20th century